The London and North Western Railway (LNWR) Special Tank was a class of  steam locomotives. They were a saddle tank version of the LNWR DX Goods class. A total of 278 locomotives were built from 1870 onwards, of which five survived to be inherited by British Railways in 1948. These five were in departmental stock: four – numbered 3 (né 317), 6, 7 (2329) and 8 Earlstown (2359) – as Carriage Department shunters at Wolverton Works; and No. 3323 (né 2322 May 1878), a shunter at Crewe Works.

References 

 
 

Special Tank
0-6-0ST locomotives
Railway locomotives introduced in 1870
Standard gauge steam locomotives of Great Britain
Scrapped locomotives